In enzymology, a 6-phospho-beta-glucosidase is an enzyme that catalyzes the chemical reaction

6-phospho-beta-D-glucosyl-(1,4)-D-glucose + H2O  D-glucose + D-glucose 6-phosphate

Thus, the two substrates of this enzyme are 6-phospho-beta-D-glucosyl-(1,4)-D-glucose and H2O, whereas its two products are D-glucose and D-glucose 6-phosphate.

This enzyme belongs to the family of hydrolases, specifically those glycosidases that hydrolyse O- and S-glycosyl compounds.  The systematic name of this enzyme class is 6-phospho-beta-D-glucosyl-(1,4)-D-glucose glucohydrolase. Other names in common use include phospho-beta-glucosidase A, phospho-beta-glucosidase, and phosphocellobiase.  This enzyme participates in glycolysis / gluconeogenesis.

Structural studies

As of late 2007, only one structure has been solved for this class of enzymes, with the PDB accession code .

References

 

EC 3.2.1
Enzymes of known structure